Anne Wellesley may refer to:
Anne Wellesley, Countess of Mornington, matriarch of the Wellesley family, (23 June 1742 – 10 September 1831)
Anne Culling Smith, born Anne Wesley (13 March 1768 - 16 December 1844)
Lady Charles Bentinck (born Anne Wellesley; 29 February 1788 – 19 March 1875) 
Anne Rhys, 7th Duchess of Ciudad Rodrigo, known as Lady Anne Wellesley from 1910 to 1933